The Mid-America Emmy Awards are a division of the National Academy of Television Arts and Sciences. The division was founded in 1976 and in addition to granting the Mid-America Emmy Awards, it recognizes awards scholarships, honors industry veterans at the Silver Circle Celebration, conducts National Student Television Awards of Excellence, has a free research and a nationwide job bank. The chapter also participates in judging Emmy entries at the regional and national levels.

References

Regional Emmy Awards
Awards established in 1976
1976 establishments in the United States